Kejong Chang is a politician from Nagaland, India. He is the oldest serving member of State Legislative Assembly in India. He was elected to the Nagaland Legislative Assembly representing Tuensang Sadar-2 Assembly constituency  in 1998 Election, 2007 By poll, 2008 election, 2009 by poll, 2013 election and 2018 Nagaland Legislative Assembly election.

References

1934 births
Living people
Naga people
Nagaland MLAs 1998–2003
Nagaland MLAs 2008–2013
Nagaland MLAs 2013–2018
Nagaland MLAs 2018–2023
People from Tuensang district
National People's Party (India) politicians